The 1978 Pennsylvania gubernatorial election was held on November 7, 1978 between Republican Dick Thornburgh and Democrat Pete Flaherty.

Primary elections

Candidates

Democratic
Bob Casey, Auditor General (from Lackawanna County) 
Pete Flaherty, US Deputy Attorney General and former Mayor of Pittsburgh (from Allegheny County)
Ernie Kline, Lt. Governor (from Westmoreland County)
Jennifer Wesner, Mayor of Knox (from Clarion County)

Republican
Bob Butera, former State House Minority Leader (from Montgomery County)
Henry Hager, State Senate Minority Leader (from Lycoming County)
Alvin Jacobson, disabled former soldier (from Adams County)
Dave Marston, former US Attorney (from Montgomery County)
Arlen Specter, former Philadelphia District Attorney
Dick Thornburgh, former US Attorney (from Allegheny County)
Andrew Watson

Campaign
The race began with a primary that slated an impressive field of candidates. Flaherty, the former Mayor of Pittsburgh who was known for providing a progressive challenge to urban machine politics, bested State Auditor General Bob Casey, who had lost the Democratic nomination for this office twice before. Casey's campaign was greatly hurt by the presence of another Bob Casey who was running on the ballot for Lieutenant Governor; voters apparently believed they were selecting a ticket of Flaherty and the Auditor General when they chose the Pittsburgh teacher as the Democratic running mate. Lieutenant Governor Ernie Kline, who was frequently known as "assistant governor" during his time in office due to his policy skills, was endorsed by outgoing governor Milton Shapp, but finished a distant third.

Thornburgh's win came over the Republican leaders of both houses of the state legislature (House Minority Leader Bob Butera and Senate Minority Leader Henry Hager), as well as a former US Attorney, Dave Marston. Former Philadelphia District Attorney and future senator Arlen Specter was considered the front-runner in the months preceding the primary, but the moderate urban Republican's campaign faded as Thornburgh presented himself as a leader that could bridge both wings of the party.

Results

Major party candidates

Democratic

Pete Flaherty, US Deputy Attorney General and former Mayor of Pittsburgh
running mate: Bob Casey, teacher

Republican

Dick Thornburgh, former US Attorney
running mate: Bill Scranton III, newspaper publisher and son of former governor Bill Scranton

Campaign
Flaherty out-polled Thornburgh by double-digit margins for much of the campaign, but the Republican candidate used highly effective strategies to close the gap in the weeks leading up to election night. Thornburgh was successful in recruiting suburban moderates, as fellow moderate Republican Specter encouraged his metro Philadelphia supporters to rally behind Thornburgh. In contrast, the liberal Flaherty had trouble reaching out to conservative Democrats outside of his Western Pennsylvania base, a problem hindered by Casey's tepid support for the candidate over the lieutenant gubernatorial issue. Thornburgh also aggressively courted traditionally Democratic-leaning groups and gained the endorsements of the NAACP and several labor unions. Democratic support slowly waned under this strategy, which allowed Thornburgh to take a close victory.

Results

Notes

References

 

1978
Gubernatorial
Pennsylvania
November 1978 events in the United States